Governors Island is a small island in New York City.

Governors Island or Governor's Island may also refer to:

 Governor's Island, Bermuda
 Governors Island (Prince Edward Island), Canada
 Governors Island (Massachusetts), in Boston Harbor
 Governors Island (Lake Winnipesaukee), New Hampshire
 Governor's Island, in Island Pond (Rockingham County, New Hampshire)
 Governors Island (North Carolina), in Lake Norman
 Governors Island (Bryson City, North Carolina), listed on the National Register of Historic Places listings in Swain County, North Carolina

See also
 Governors Island National Monument, on the island in New York City
 Governor Island (disambiguation)
 Governador Island in Rio de Janeiro
 Gouverneur Island (southern Antarctica)